The deacon Apollonius and his convert Philemon were Christian martyrs of the Diocletianic Persecution around 303. Philemon was a famous flute player, mime and actor at Antinoöpolis in Egypt.

Narrative
During the persecution, Philemon dons the deacon's clothes so that, disguised as Apollonius, he may offer the required sacrifice to Jupiter in his stead, and the deacon avoid imprisonment and death. However, just before performing the public sacrifice, Philemon is recognized and declares himself a Christian, and refuses to make the sacrifice.

They were brought from Antinoë to Alexandria, and were there put to death with many others who had become believers in Christ. Their fate was to be bound hand and foot and to be cast into the sea.

Veneration
Their feast day is 8 March. Philemon is the patron saint of dancers.

Legacy
The story formed the subject of Philemon Martyr, a play by Jacob Bidermann. Bidermann presents acting as "a potential route to moral and spiritual transformation".

Philemon is a recurring motif in the work of the twentieth-century British artist Albert Houthuesen.

References

External links
Philemon at Catholic Online
Philemon at Patron Saints Index
8 March saints at St. Patrick's Church

Saints from Roman Egypt
305 deaths
4th-century Christian saints
4th-century Egyptian people
Ancient Roman actors
Year of birth unknown